Merkourios Karaliopoulos (born 26 November 1977) is a retired Greek football defender.

References

1977 births
Living people
Greek footballers
Naoussa F.C. players
Aris Thessaloniki F.C. players
Apollon Pontou FC players
Veria F.C. players
Rodos F.C. players
Super League Greece players
Association football defenders
Footballers from Alexandreia, Greece